Mohammadabad-e kouhpayeh is a village in Jolgah Rural District, in the Central District of Jahrom County, Fars Province, Iran. At the 2016 census, its population was 63, in 17 families.

References 

Populated places in Jahrom County